Music Feeds is a free bi-weekly digital music and lifestyle magazine (street press) established in 2008 and based in Sydney, Australia. It is distributed electronically every second Tuesday, with additional material posted on the website regularly.

As distinct from direct competitors Drum Media and The Brag, Music Feeds purports to cover more independent and self-funded musicians. This is a distinction that has been noted by several local music sources.

Since 2012, Music Feeds moved to a 24/7 online music publication and regularly covers local and international music news, events, and releases.

References

External links
 

2008 establishments in Australia
Biweekly magazines published in Australia
Free magazines
Lifestyle magazines published in Australia
Magazines established in 2008
Magazines published in Sydney
Music magazines published in Australia